Mike Woicik (born September 26, 1956) is an American football strength and conditioning coach in the National Football League (NFL). He is tied for the record for third-most Super Bowl rings won (behind Bill Belichick and Tom Brady) with six, winning three with the Cowboys and three with the New England Patriots.

Early life
Woicik graduated from Westwood High School in Westwood, Massachusetts before attending Boston College where he earned a bachelor's degree in history. He then went to Springfield College to receive his master's degree in physical education.

Coaching career

College
Woicik began his coaching career as the track coach and weight room coordinator at Springfield from 1978 to 1980. He then was hired as a strength and conditioning coach by Syracuse University, where he stayed through 1989.

NFL
Woicik earned his first NFL coaching job in 1990 with the Cowboys as their strength and conditioning coach, replacing long-time strength coach Bob Ward. In his six-year stint, the team won three Super Bowls (Super Bowl XXVII, Super Bowl XXVIII, and Super Bowl XXX). He then served the New Orleans Saints in the same capacity from the 1997 season through the 1999 season. In 2000, he was hired by the Patriots, where he won another three Super Bowls with the team (Super Bowl XXXVI, Super Bowl XXXVIII, and Super Bowl XXXIX).

On February 11, 2011, Woicik finalized a deal to rejoin the Cowboys as their strength conditioning coach. On January 14, 2020, Woicik was informed that he would not be retained for the 2020 Season by new head coach Mike McCarthy.

Awards and honors
 NFL Strength Coach of the Year – 1992
 Professional Football Strength and Conditioning Society's Coach of the Year Award – 1992
 Professional Football Strength and Conditioning Society's Coach of the Year Award – 2004

Personal life
Woicik authored the book Total Conditioning for Football: The Syracuse Way (1985).

References

External links
 New England Patriots profile
 Woicik now conditioned to Super Bowl success

1956 births
American strength and conditioning coaches
Living people
Boston College Eagles football players
Dallas Cowboys coaches
New Orleans Saints coaches
New England Patriots coaches
Syracuse Orange football coaches
College track and field coaches in the United States
Springfield College (Massachusetts) alumni
Players of American football from Baltimore